Mooselookmeguntic Lake is located in Franklin County and Oxford County, Maine, in the United States. It is part of the Androscoggin River watershed. It is located in the western part of Maine, near the border with the state of New Hampshire and the Canadian province of Quebec. The lake is just a few miles from the Appalachian Trail.

There are two islands in the southern portion of Mooselookmeguntic Lake called "Toothaker Island" and "Students Island".

Name 
The name "Mooselookmeguntic" is an Abnaki word for "moose feeding place." Variant names listed by the USGS include "Mooselocmaguntic Lake" and "Mooselookmeguntick Lake".

Hydrology
Mooselookmeguntic Lake receives water from several sources. The Cupsuptic River flows into Cupsuptic Lake, which is directly connected with the northern part of Mooselookmeguntic Lake. The Rangeley River and Kennebago River both flow into northeastern Mooselookmeguntic Lake.

The lake's waters flow out to the southeast, into Upper Richardson Lake. There is a dam between the two lakes called "Upper Dam". The dam raised the level of Mooselookmeguntic Lake about 14 feet, causing it to become joined to Cupsuptic Lake forming a reservoir. The two lakes had been separate before the dam was built.

It is the sixth largest lake in Maine.

Environment 
The lake has a variety of fish, and is a popular tourist attraction for fishing. It is surrounded by the Stephen Phillips Memorial Preserve protected wilderness area.

In literature 
Lake Mooselookmeguntic is the location of the action in the book "Magic Thinks Big", an illustrated children's book by Elisha Cooper. The book features paintings of one of the islands in the lake, as well as a panorama of the lake.

References

External links

Reservoirs in Maine
Lakes of Franklin County, Maine
Lakes of Oxford County, Maine
North Maine Woods
Northern Forest Canoe Trail